The summit of Halti at 1,365 m is in Norway, which makes Ridnitsohkka the highest summit in Finland.

 
Finland
Mountains
Finland